Alex Wolf (born 19 April 1997) is an American water polo player. He competed in the 2020 Summer Olympics.

Biography
Alex Wolf was born in Anaheim, California. He grew up in Huntington Beach California where he attended Huntington Beach High School (HBHS), Class of 2015. As a young child he played basketball, baseball and soccer. When he was nine years old, his older brother started playing water polo for Huntington Beach Water Polo Club after an orthopedist steered him to water sports due to an orthopedic issue. Alex decided that he wanted to play water polo too. Since he was already tall for his age and because his brother was playing well as a goalie, the coaches put him in goal. When he was twelve years old, he began participating in the USA Water Polo Olympic Development Program. He continued playing at HBHS and then at University of California Los Angeles (UCLA). During high school and college, he also played on the Cadet, Youth, Junior, and Senior National Teams. He is 6' 8" and 225 pounds.

As a freshman at HBHS, Alex started on the Junior Varsity water polo team. As a sophomore he was made starting goalie for Varsity. During high school he was MVP for all four years, earned Sunset League First Team Honors for three years, and CIF First Team Honors and All American for two years. As a junior he was named to the All-Orange-County Second Team. In his senior year he was named All Orange County Player of the Year. As a sophomore, he set the school record for saves in a single season and broke that record as a junior and set a new one as a senior.

Alex also played volleyball all four years at Huntington Beach High School. His team went undefeated for three and a half years. He was a starting middle blocker and won two CIF championships. In his senior year he was named to All Orange County First Team.

Education
Alex graduated from UCLA with a degree in Economics where he made the Dean's list 12 out of 13 quarters. As an Incoming Freshman in the summer of 2015, he was the starting goalie at the World University Games, where UCLA represented the USA. The won a bronze medal. Alex played backup goalie his freshman year when he won his first NCAA Championship. He redshirted his sophomore year in anticipation of ending his college career at the beginning of the training run for the 2020 Olympics. He earned CWPA All -All American honors 3 times. During his junior year he won a second NCAA Championship and was named MVP of the tournament. He was nominated for the Cutino Award during his Senior year.

Career 

 2011-2012 USA Water Polo Cadet National Team
 2012-2013 USA Water Polo Cadet National Team
 2013-2014 USA Water Polo Youth National Team
 2014 USA Water Polo Youth National Team
 UANA Junior Pan American Championships –Riverside, CA Gold Medal
 Memorial di Acireale Tournament - Sicily
 Istanbul Cup - Istanbul, Turkey
 FINA World Youth Championships – Istanbul, Turkey
 2015 USA Water Polo Senior National Team
 AQUATIC SUPER SERIES, PERTH, AUSTRALIA
 2015 USA Water Polo Youth National Team
 World University Games -Seoul South Korea Bronze Medal
 2017 USA Water Polo Senior National Team
 FINA MEN'S INTERCONTINENTAL QUALIFYING TOURNAMENT, GOLD COAST, AUSTRALIA, Silver Medal & Best Goal Keeper
 2018 USA Water Polo Senior National Team
 FINA INTERCONTINENTAL TOURNAMENT, AUCKLAND, NEW ZEALAND, Gold Medal
 FINA WORLD LEAGUE SUPER FINAL, BUDAPEST, HUNGARY, 7TH PLACE
 2019 USA Water Polo Senior National Team
 China Wenjiang International Water Polo Tournament Gold Medal
 FINA WORLD CHAMPIONSHIPS, GWANGJU, SOUTH KOREA, 9TH PLACE
 PAN AMERICAN GAMES, LIMA, PERU, 1ST PLACE
 2020 COVID
 2021 USA Water Polo Senior National Team
 FINA WORLD LEAGUE SUPER FINAL, Tbilisi, Georgia Silver MedaL
 2020 (2021) Olympic Games in Tokyo, Japan, 6TH PLACE

Professional career
During the spring of 2021 Alex played for Hydraikos in Athens, Greece.

In January 2023, Alex began playing for Nautical Club of Chios on the island of Chios in Greece.

Personal
Alex is the youngest son of Kimberly and Kenneth Wolf; he has an older sister, Kate and an older brother, Michael. He is an avid reader, preferring, biographies, history, and fiction. He enjoys cooking a variety of cuisines. In his free time, he dabbles in hand-crafted leather work, making shoes, wallets, tote bags, and money clips. Alex enjoys playing volleyball and basketball and is a huge fan of Bucks player Giannis Antetokounmpo.

References

External links
 UCLA Bruins bio

Living people
1997 births
American male water polo players
Olympic water polo players of the United States
Water polo players at the 2020 Summer Olympics
UCLA Bruins men's water polo players
Water polo goalkeepers
Sportspeople from Anaheim, California
Sportspeople from Huntington Beach, California
Pan American Games medalists in water polo
Pan American Games gold medalists for the United States
Water polo players at the 2019 Pan American Games
Medalists at the 2019 Pan American Games